Seliger is an educational forum (camp) held since 2005 at Lake Seliger in the Russian Tver Region (350 km from Moscow).

Since 2015, it has been succeeded by a new forum organized by the Federal Agency for Youth Affairs "Rosmolodezh" on a new site, with a new name "Territory of Meanings"

History 

The emblem of the Seliger Forum was a smiley face in a red garrison cap of the flag of the "Nashi" youth movement
In 2000-2005, the first participants in this platform were activists of the Walking Together youth movement.
In 2005-2008, the closed commissar camp of the youth movement "Nashi", for activists and commissars of the movement. In 2005, it was attended by about three thousand participants. The camp took place in one shift for two weeks and was divided into the following directions of movement: economic, social, tourist, mass actions. Commissars and activists of the Nashi movement from all regional and city branches gathered in the camp, shared their experiences, underwent ideological and sports training. Practicing techniques and conducting mass actions, social work. In fact, the camp was a training base for training future commissars of the movement. The educational program was conducted by the National Institute "Graduate School of Management" (VSHU) under the "Nashi" movement, which was attended by commissars and activists of the movement. In 2009, within the framework of the Year of Youth, the Seliger Commissioner Camp was reorganized into an educational forum and was open to all active and talented youth. The educational program for the forum participants was presented by the Sholokhov Moscow State University for the Humanities.

Seliger forums bring together young people to study and discuss issues in political science, economics, art, literature and culture. According to the head of the Federal Agency for Youth Affairs, Leader of the youth movement NASHI Vasily Yakemenko, "The aim of the Seliger forums is to provide each talented young individual with a chance to realize their potential to the fullest, to convert talent into success". About 50 000 young people aged from 11 to 30 took part in the forum in 2009.

Talented youth, which has many innovative ideas, has gathered at forum, and they have possibility to receive more knowledge to become effective managers and organizers of youth movements and innovative projects after Seliger's end. The youngest inventor of the country is 11-year-old Sergey Lushkovsky, Liliya Anisimova's project about creation of biological preparation for cleaning soil, a complex of the wind-energetic plant of Evgenie Kurkin, and also projects in the sphere of cultural exchange interactions – Maxim Zhiljaev – decision of problems of international interactions, Sergey Digonskiy's project on preparation negotiator in interethnic conflicts (negotiator, negociador), «Style Laboratory» by Darya Morinoj for all who wants to live in bright and attractive Russia. Known politicians, scientists, businessmen, cultural workers, professors (from prestigious universities), scientists, and show business stars were invited to "Seliger". They organized master classes for youth, gave lectures, simply communicated with youth, and shared their experience. Many young men admitted that these lectures and master classes gave very useful and unique information which can be used in the projects and in work.

This year, the forum consisted of eight thematic parts. Each part worked some days. Part "the Zvorykinsky project" gave the chance to thousands young men to become successful by commercialization the inventions. Participants of forum 48 agreements about support and financing their works and assigned more than 100 million roubles for projects. Corporation "Rusnano" is interested in projects of young inventors. Participants of part "You are businessman" signed more than 700 agreements with companies, organizations and private persons. The sum of assigned meals for young businessmen became about 130 million roubles. More than 200 participants of part received certificates  for taking part in MBI educational programs.

The result of part "Information stream" (school of youth journalists) became agreement for creating professional community media information labour potential of Russia.

The agreement was signed by Jakemenko, the main editor of "Moscow  Komsomol" - Pavel Gusev, main editor of newspaper "Work" - Vladimir Borodin. President of journalist faculty of MSU - Jasen Zasursky and head of "Russian journalist's union" - Vsevolod Bogdanov supported project.

Over 500 agreements were signed during volunteer program "Technologies of kind". Sponsorship for it was 50 million RUR.

During the "Artparad" program, 150 agreements were signed and sponsored 20 million roubles.   

At the end of the 2013 Forum, the first public images of the flag of the Donetsk People's Republic made during the forum appeared  on the Internet.
In 2014, the Seliger 2014 Forum was jubilee, the symbolism and its format were changed. The forum consisted of 4 independent forums (races). (The first and second run - the Forum of youth projects, the third run - the "Russia in the Center" Forum, the fourth run - the Civic Forum. Young designers and architects, Russkaya Pravda, Youth Self-Government, Librarian of the Future, Regions of Russia. More than 1200 representatives of Moscow youth organizations took part in the forum.

Financing 
Forum Seliger from the budget of Rosmolodezh and other sources, in 2009 received more than 145 million rubles, in 2010 received more than 180 million rubles, in 2011 received more than 110 million rubles, in 2012 received more than 280 million rubles from the state budget, in 2013 received about 250 million rubles, in 2014 received about 240 million rubles.

Forum leadership 
 2005-2007 - Forum Director - Valery Gogaladze - Federal Project Manager Tourism - Our Tourism / Territory.

Criticism 

As the organization Nashi, the camp is described as an attempt by the Kremlin to indoctrinate Russian youth and to make them immune to democracy aspirations such as those that played an important role in the orange revolution.

Alexei Venediktov, editor-in-chief of the "Echo of Moscow radio station", spoke negatively about the Seliger forum for displaying the fake heads of various figures.

From 17 to 20 June 2011 Russian civic and opposition organizations held near Moscow an alternative forum Antiseliger.

References

External links 
 Official website of the International Forum Seliger
 Official website forum Seliger

 Official Blogpost of the International Forum Seliger

Education in Russia
Politics of Russia
Music festivals in Russia
Youth
Educational programs